Polyhymno intortoides is a moth of the family Gelechiidae. It was described by Anthonie Johannes Theodorus Janse in 1950. It is found in Zimbabwe and South Africa (Gauteng, the Northern Cape, KwaZulu-Natal).

References

Moths described in 1950
Polyhymno